Guthichaur is a rural municipality located in Jumla District of the Karnali Province of Nepal. It is 427 km², with population of 9,920.

References

External links
 Official website

Populated places in Jumla District
Rural municipalities in Karnali Province
Rural municipalities of Nepal established in 2017